Delron Sebastian Buckley (born 7 December 1977) is a South African former professional footballer. His preferred position was the left wing although he could also play as a striker. In September 2021, he was appointed Head Coach of the University of KwaZulu-Natal soccer team.

Club career
Born in Durban, Buckley's football career began with his local team Butcherfille Rovers Durban. At the age of 17 he was signed by German club VfL Bochum. Buckley spent most of his career in Germany, going through Bochum's youth teams and debuting in the Bundesliga in 1995. Buckley finally broke into the first squad in 1998 and remained a starter for much of his time at Bochum.

Having spent nine professional seasons with Bochum, Buckley left in 2004 for Arminia Bielefeld where he enjoyed his most successful season personally, scoring 15 goals and helping the team avoid relegation. Buckley quickly picked up interest from higher-rated clubs. After only one season at Bielefeld, Buckley joined Borussia Dortmund for a reported transfer fee of €425,000, and signed a four-year contract.

Buckley's first season at Borussia Dortmund was largely unsuccessful as he failed to score in 28 league matches. Widely regarded as bad signing, Buckley was loaned to Swiss club FC Basel 1893.

He joined Basel's first team during their 2006–07 season under head coach Christian Gross, who was starting his eighth season in that position. Gross relied on Buckley from the first moment and he played his team debut in the Swiss Cup away game on 26 August. He also scored his first goal with the team in the same game as Basel won 6–1 against local amateur club FC Liestal. He played his domestic league debut for Basel on 10 September 2006 at home in the St. Jakob-Park as Basel won 2–1 against FC Zürich. In the first round of the 2006–07 UEFA Cup Basel won 7–2 on aggregate against FK Rabotnički to qualified for the group stage. Here Basel played their first match at home against Feyenoord, this ended in a 1–1 draw. The second was away and lost 3–0 away against Blackburn Rovers. At home against AS Nancy the match was drawn 2–2 and the final game ended ended with a 3–1 defeat against Wisła Kraków. Basel ended the group stage in last position in the table and were eliminated. Bukley played in all six of these matches. At the end of the 2006–07 Super League season Basel were runners-up, one point behind championship winners Zürich. In the Swiss Cup Basel advanced to the final, beating FC Liestal in the first round, Lugano, FC Baulmes, Aarau and Wil in the semi-final. In the final they played Luzern and won this 1–0 thanks to a penalty goal in the third minute of added time. In his loan period with the club, Buckley played a total of 41 games for Basel scoring a total of six goals. 22 of these games were in the Swiss Super League, five in the Swiss Cup, six in the UEFA Cup and eight were friendly games. He scored one goal in the domestic league, three in the cup and the other three were scored during the test games.

After returning to Dortmund in July 2007, Buckley was able to regain his place in the Borussia squad for the 2007–08 season, but fell out of favour after the arrival of new manager Jürgen Klopp.

In February 2009, he signed for 1. FSV Mainz 05 for the remainder of the season and was released on 30 June 2009. He then moved to Cyprian club Anorthosis Famagusta FC where he played until the end of 2010–11 season.

In January 2011, he transferred to 2. Bundesliga team Karlsruher SC.

On 26 June 2012, he signed for Maritzburg United, playing for the first time in his career in South Africa.

International career
Buckley made his international debut for the South Africa national team in a friendly against Zambia on 20 May 1998. He played 73 games and scored 10 goals for South Africa. Buckley represented his country at the 1998 FIFA World Cup, 2002 FIFA World Cup and the 2004 African Nations Cup.

Career statistics
Scores and results list South Africa's goal tally first, score column indicates score after each Buckley goal.

Honours
Borussia Dortmund
 DFB-Pokal runner-up: 2007–08

References

External links
 
 Delron Buckley at kicker.de 

Living people
1977 births
Cape Coloureds
South African people of German descent
Sportspeople from Durban
South African soccer players
Association football midfielders
South Africa international soccer players
Olympic soccer players of South Africa
1998 FIFA World Cup players
2002 FIFA World Cup players
Footballers at the 2000 Summer Olympics
2002 African Cup of Nations players
2004 African Cup of Nations players
Bundesliga players
2. Bundesliga players
Cypriot First Division players
Swiss Super League players
VfL Bochum II players
VfL Bochum players
Arminia Bielefeld players
Borussia Dortmund players
FC Basel players
Borussia Dortmund II players
1. FSV Mainz 05 players
Anorthosis Famagusta F.C. players
Karlsruher SC players
Maritzburg United F.C. players
South African expatriate soccer players
South African expatriate sportspeople in Germany
Expatriate footballers in Germany
South African expatriate sportspeople in Switzerland
Expatriate footballers in Switzerland
South African expatriate sportspeople in Cyprus
Expatriate footballers in Cyprus